The Inspector General of Puerto Rico is the inspector general of the government of Puerto Rico and leads the Office of the Inspector General of the Government of Puerto Rico.

References

Cabinet-level officers of the Cabinet of Puerto Rico